Salmond is the name of:

People
Anne Salmond (born 1945), New Zealand historian, anthropologist and writer
Alex Salmond (born 1954), Scottish politician and former First Minister of Scotland
Rev Dr Charles Salmond (1853-1932), Scottish minister and ecclesiastical author
Felix Salmond (1888–1952),  English cellist
George Salmond (born 1969), Scottish cricketer and football referee
Sir John Maitland Salmond (1881–1968), senior commander in the Royal Air Force and brother of William Geoffrey Hanson Salmond
William Salmond (disambiguation):
Major-General Sir William Salmond (British Army officer) (1840–1932)
Sir William Geoffrey Hanson Salmond (1878–1933), senior commander in the Royal Air Force, brother of John Maitland Salmond, son of Major-General Sir William Salmond
Sir John William Salmond,  (1862–1924), legal scholar based in New Zealand
James Salmond (1536–1545), Prior of Blantyre in Scotland
J. B. Salmond (James Bell Salmond; 1891-1985), journalist, poet and novelist
James Louis Salmond (1868–1950), New Zealand architect 
James Salmond (minister) (1898–1976), leader in the Presbyterian Church of New Zealand  
Kathleen Salmond (1895–1946), New Zealand artist

Other
Salmond College, formerly Salmond Hall, at the University of Otago in New Zealand